Robert Paweł Zawada (born 7 June 1944 in Jedlnia-Letnisko, Radom County) is a former Polish handball player who competed in the 1972 Summer Olympics.

In 1972 he was part of the Polish team which finished tenth in the Olympic tournament. He played two matches and scored three goals.

External links
profile 

1944 births
Living people
Polish male handball players
Olympic handball players of Poland
Handball players at the 1972 Summer Olympics
People from Radom County
Sportspeople from Masovian Voivodeship